Nordin Bakker (born 31 October 1997) is a Dutch professional footballer who plays as a goalkeeper for Almere City.

Club career
He made his Eerste Divisie debut for Volendam on 7 December 2018 in a game against Twente as a 10th-minute substitute for injured Mitchel Michaelis.

On 28 January 2022, Bakker signed a six-month contract with Almere City with an option to extend.

References

External links
 

1997 births
People from Wormerland
Living people
Dutch footballers
Association football goalkeepers
FC Volendam players
PFC Beroe Stara Zagora players
Almere City FC players
Eerste Divisie players
Derde Divisie players
First Professional Football League (Bulgaria) players
Dutch expatriate footballers
Expatriate footballers in Bulgaria
Dutch expatriate sportspeople in Bulgaria
Footballers from North Holland